The Cracăul Negru is a river in Neamț County, Romania. At its confluence with the Cracăul Alb in Magazia, the river Cracău is formed.

Tributaries

The following rivers are tributaries to the river Cracăul Negru (from source to mouth):

Left: Aluniș, Tisa
Right: Șoimul, Pârâul Răchitelor, Pârâul Gradului, Bălmuș

References

External links
 Tourist map, Parcul Vânători-Neamț

Rivers of Romania
Rivers of Neamț County